Technical geography is the branch of geography that involves using, studying, and creating tools to obtain, analyze, interpret, and understand spatial information. The other two branches, human geography and physical geography, can usually apply the concepts and techniques of technical geography. However, the methods and theory are distinct, and a technical geographer may be more concerned with the technological and theoretical concepts than the nature of the data. Thus, the spatial data types a technical geographer employs may vary widely, including human and physical geography topics, with the common thread being the techniques and philosophies employed. While technical geography mostly works with quantitative data, the techniques and technology can make use of qualitative datasets, differentiating it from quantitative geography.  Within the branch of technical geography are the major and overlapping subbranches of geographic information science, geomatics, and geoinformatics.

Etymology
The term "technical geography" is a combination of the words "technical," from the Greek τεχνικός (technikós meaning art or craft), meaning relating to a particular subject or activity and involving practical skills, and "geography," from Greek γεωγραφία (geographia, a combination of Greek words ‘Geo’ (The Earth) and ‘Graphien’ to describe. Literally "earth description"), a field of science devoted to the study of the lands, features, inhabitants, and phenomena of Earth. The origin of technical geography as a term can be traced at least as far back as 1749 in the publication "Geography reformed: a new system of general geography, according to an accurate analysis of the science in four parts." This publication by Edward Cave divided the publication into four parts, one of which was named "containing technical geography." Edward Caves' book focused on both globes and maps under the section on technical geography, including concepts of cartographic design, and projection. In this book, they stated they chose to use the term "technical geography" rather than "practical geography" to clarify that the branch is distinct in theory and methods. This publication defines technical geography with the following:

Technical geography as a term is more than simply place name recollection and involves spatial relationships between points, and theory. As a modern concept, the term is intrinsically linked to geography's quantitative revolution in the 1950s and 1960s. It focuses on spatial statistics and visualizing spatial information, emphasizing quantitative data and the scientific method. It re-emerges as a branch of geography in the 2000s, and, as such, is a much more novel term, and less established in the literature, than either human or physical. While the term  has been put forward as a distinct branch and umbrella for these wider concepts, however, the terms used to describe the study of spatial information as a distinct category vary. When subdividing the discipline within the literature, similar categories—such as "techniques of geographic analysis", "geographic information and analysis", "geographic information technology", "geography methods and techniques", and "quantitative geography"—are used to describe the same, or similar, concepts as technical geography. It is closely associated with, and sometimes used interchangeably with, the subfield of geographic information science. Many of these terms or phrases are "grammatically awkward" and do not link the discipline explicitly as a branch of geography. Each one also varies slightly in definition and scope, with some focusing more on how the technology applies to human or physical geography than how it is distinct in focus. The term  is used alongside physical geography and human geography by the UNESCO Encyclopedia of Life Support Systems to divide geography into themes. The benefit of this wording is that it is consistent with the other two branches and clearly places the discipline within geography. There are other existing models to subdivide the discipline of geography into categories and focuses, including the four traditions of geography, which may vary dramatically between publications.

Sub-branches

Techniques

History

Early history
The term technical geography as a distinct concept in geography dates back as far as 1749 in the publication "Geography reformed: a new system of general geography, according to an accurate analysis of the science in four parts." This book distinguishes the term as a subdivision within geography, focusing on cartography and cartographic theory. While the date the term first entered the English lexicon may be difficult to ascertain, technical geography techniques date back to cartography, surveying, and remote sensing. 

In 1902, geodesy was suggested as a discipline supporting technical geography. By 1917, technical geography was included among courses taught at some British schools, alongside mathematics, chemistry, and other natural sciences. As techniques and concepts in technical geography advanced, geographers began to lament the lack of understanding and use of more advanced geographic concepts in society and law. Specifically, this became an issue during The Michigan-Wisconsin Boundary Case in the Supreme Court of the United States, where the border was not defined with specific technical geographic concepts.

Quantitative revolution

Technical geography differentiated more clearly during the quantitative revolution in the 1950s and 1960s. Before this, the techniques and methods of handling spatial information were primarily focused on supporting human or physical geography, rather than a subject of study itself. World War II, which saw the extensive use of cartography and air photos, revolutionized these techniques and brought a new focus on the benefits they offered. In the years before the quantitative revolution, geography was generally fragmented and focused on descriptive approaches, and many United States universities were eliminating geography departments around the country. To address this, geographers began to debate the merits of more scientific and methods-based approaches to the discipline and advocate for the benefits these methods had to other technical courses. Some, such as influential cartographer George Jenks went as far as to suggest that cartography should be a separate academic discipline from geography entirely, even if only at a few academic institutions. This approach was shunned by more traditional geographers, who viewed it as a deviation from how geographers had always viewed and interacted with maps. While how best to approach the technical aspect of geography was heavily debated among geographers, geography departments at universities across the country began to teach a more scientific approach to geography. During the early days of the quantitative revolution, the term quantitative geography emerged as a subdiscipline within technical geography focusing exclusively on these quantitative methods for handling spatial data.

Laws of geography

The main claim for the quantitative revolution is that it led to a shift from a descriptive (idiographic) geography to an empirical law-making (nomothetic) geography. The first of these laws was proposed by Waldo Tobler in his 1970 paper,"A Computer Movie Simulating Urban Growth in the Detroit Region," and more have been proposed since. In general, like the concept of technical geography, some geographers argue against the idea that laws in geography are necessary or even valid. These criticisms have been addressed by Tobler and others. Examples of these laws include Tobler's first law of geography, Tobler's second law of geography, and Arbia's law of geography.

Remote sensing

Along with computers and GIS, new spatial data sources emerged during the quantitative revolution. Air photo technology was widely used in World War I and, in subsequent years, was applied to civilian endeavors. A 1941 textbook titled "Aerophotography and Aerosurverying" stated the following in the first line of its preference: 

Remote sensing technology again advanced rapidly during World War II, and the techniques employed were rapidly assimilated as aids in geographical studies. During the Cold War, advancements in photography, aircraft, and rockets only increased the effectiveness of remote sensing techniques. As the technology became available to the general public, geographers were soon overwhelmed with large volumes of satellite and aerial images. New techniques were required to store, process, analyze, and use this new data source, birthing remote sensing scientists.

Digital mapping and Geographic information systems

Coinciding with the quantitative revolution was the emergence of early computers. The interdisciplinary nature of geography forces geographers to look at developments in other fields, and geographers tend to observe and adapt technological innovations from other disciplines rather than developing unique technologies to conduct geographic studies. Computers were no exception. More than a decade after the first computers were developed, Waldo Tobler published the first paper detailing the use of computers in the map-making process titled "Automation and Cartography" in 1959. While novel in terms of application, the process detailed by Tobler did not allow for storing or analyzing of geographic data. As computer technology progressed and better hardware became available, geographers rapidly adopted the technology to create maps. In 1960, Roger Tomlinson created the first true geographic information system, which allowed for storing and analysis of spatial data within a computer. These tools revolutionized the discipline of geography. In 1985, Mark Monmonier speculated that computer cartography facilitated by GIS would largely replace traditional pen and paper cartography.

With the emergence of GIS, researchers rapidly began to explore methods to use the technology for various geographic problems. This led some geographers to declare the study of these methods their own science within geography.

Global Positioning System

In 1978 the United States military launched the first satellites to enable the modern Global Positioning System, and the system's full capability was made available to the general public in 2000. This facilitated a level of rapid acquisition of spatial coordinates that previously would have been prohibitively expensive. Geographers began studying methods and applications for this data.

Technical geography in the 21st century

As these new technologies and methods are widely applicable to various disciplines, concern grew among geographers that these other non-geographers in other disciplines might become better at using them than geographers. In 2016, Ionel Haidu stated:

Technical geography as a concept emerges to correct the historical trend in the geography of adapting rather than developing new methods, technologies, and techniques for conducting geographic research by encouraging trained geographers to pursue this line of inquiry. While the use of the term "technical geography" itself has been debated since at least the 1700s, concepts within technical geography are often separated from the rest of geography when organizing and categorizing subfields in the discipline. Terms such as "techniques of geographic analysis", "geographic information technology", are used synonymously with the term within textbooks. In 2006, the peer-reviewed journal Geographia Technica was established to serve as an outlet for research employing quantitative methods within geography. While a small journal by comparison, all publications within it fall under, and presumably endorse the technical geography term.

As technology such as GIS began to dominate geography departments, the need to develop new curriculum to teach the fundamental concepts became apparent. In response to this, the University Consortium for Geographic Information Science was established, and in 2006 published Geographic Information Science and Technology Body of Knowledge (GISTBoK).  The GISTBoK is designed to inform curriculum teaching GIS and other geospatial technologies. While the book does not mention technical geography specifically, it serves as a landmark for the rapid growth of methods associated with technical geography in academic institutions. Today, while GIS&T is a common descriptor for clusters of courses involving concepts described in the GISTBoK, several geography departments use the term technical geography to describe clusters of courses offered that fall under the GIS&T umbrella, including University of Maryland and South Dakota State University.

In 2009, UNESCO Encyclopedia of Life Support Systems employed the term technical geography to organize their literature related to geography, establishing a three-branch model of technical, human, and physical geography. The categorization of technical geography as a branch is expanded upon by Ionel Haidu in his 2016 paper.

Controversy and criticism

Ontological criticism
Subdividing any discipline is a difficult matter, and geography is no exception. Geography is very fragmented as a discipline, with a history spanning cultures and thousands of years. There are other competing terms within the discipline, often used interchangeably with technical geography and each other to subdivide the discipline, including "techniques of geographic analysis", "geographic information technology", geographic information science, geoinformatics, and information geography. Each term has slightly differing definitions and scopes, and the best word choice has been debated in the literature since at least the 1700s when Cave defended the use of technical geography over practical geography. Ultimately, the word choice is semantical, but the decision to use different terms for the same concept is one of many contributing factors to the term technical geography having less supporting literature then human or physical geography. 

More controversially, others deny the idea that the thought and techniques of geography constitute a new branch. This argument asserts that geography must be applied and, therefore, must focus on some subset of human or physical geography. They also argue that there is not enough well-established peer-reviewed literature to back the term as a new branch.

Critical geography

In response to the ideas and philosophies advanced during the quantitative revolution, critical geography emerged and advanced many criticisms of the methods and ideas of technical geographers. Other geographers have criticized that geography has moved away from the abstract, unquantifiable aspects of place that are essential to the understanding of geography. 

Some have brought allegations that technical geography has introduced gender bias into geography departments as the discipline is disproportionately practiced by men and seen by some as more masculine.

Publications
Applied Geography
 The Professional Geographer
 Geographical Bulletin
 Geographia Technica – journal focused exclusively on technical geography
 Remote Sensing of Environment
 Annals of the American Association of Geographers
Journal of Maps

Influential geographers

Anne Kelly Knowles (Born 1957) – influential in the use of GIS and geographic methods in History.
Dana Tomlin – developer of map algebra
Cynthia Brewer – cartographic theorist that created the Apache 2.0 licensed web application ColorBrewer
Gerardus Mercator (1512–1594) – a cartographer who produced the Mercator projection
Keith C. Clarke (born 1955) - prominent and heavily cited author in computer cartography and spatial analysis.
Michael DeMers (born 1951) – geographer that wrote numerous books contributing to geographic information systems
Mark Monmonier (born 1943) – cartographic theorist that wrote numerous books contributing to geographic information systems
Mei-Po Kwan (born 1962) - geographer that coined the uncertain geographic context problem and the neighborhood effect averaging problem.
Michael Frank Goodchild (born 1944) – GIS scholar and winner of the RGS founder's medal in 2003
Roger Tomlinson (1933–2014) – the primary originator of modern geographic information systems
Waldo Tobler (1930–2018) – coined the first and second law of geography

See also

Areography (geography of Mars)
Concepts and Techniques in Modern Geography
Earth system science
Environmental science
Environmental studies
Geomorphology
Neogeography
Planetary science
Uncertain geographic context problem

References